Nodozana pyrophora is a moth of the subfamily Arctiinae. It was described by George Hampson in 1911. It is found in Bolivia.

References

Lithosiini
Moths described in 1911